HMT (Hired Military Transport) Dunera was a British passenger ship which, in 1940, became involved in a controversial transportation of thousands of "enemy aliens" to Australia. The British India Steam Navigation Company had operated a previous , which served as a troopship during the Second Boer War.

Early service as a troopship

After trials in 1937, she was handed over to the British-India Steam Navigation Company and served as a passenger liner and an educational cruise ship before seeing extensive service as a troopship throughout the Second World War. She was taken over by the Royal Navy as a troopship before hostilities started, and was taking troops to the Far East when her crew heard the news of war at Malta on 3 September 1939 (from private diary of telegraphist R H Wood). Dunera carried New Zealand troops to Egypt in January 1940.

Transport voyage to Australia

Background
After Britain declared war on Germany the government set up aliens tribunals to distinguish Nazi sympathisers from refugees who had fled from Nazism. As a result, 568 were classified as unreliable, 6,800 were left at liberty but subject to restrictions, and 65,000 were regarded as "friendly". However, after the fall of France, the loss of the Low Countries and Italy's declaration of war, Britain stood alone against the Axis and anxieties became acute. In what Winston Churchill later regretted as "a deplorable and regrettable mistake," all Austrians and Germans, and many Italians, were suspected of being enemy agents, potentially helping to plan the invasion of Britain, and a decision was made to deport them. Canada agreed to take some of them and Australia others, though, "not since the middle of the nineteenth century had Australia received the unwanted of Britain transported across the world for the purposes of incarceration."

Voyage
On 10 July 1940, 2,542 detainees, all classified as "enemy aliens", were embarked aboard Dunera at Liverpool. While the detainees included 200 Italian and 251  German prisoners of war, as well as several dozen Nazi sympathizers, the majority were 2,036 Italian and German civilians who were anti-Nazi, most of them Jewish refugees. Some had already been to sea but their ship, the  had been torpedoed en route to Canada, with great loss of life. In addition to the passengers were 309 poorly trained guards, mostly from the Auxiliary Military Pioneer Corps, as well as seven officers and the ship's crew, creating a total complement of almost twice the Duneras capacity as a troop carrier of 1,600.

The internees' possessions were rifled through and disposed of. Moreover, the 57-day voyage was made under the risk of possible attack. But it was the physical conditions and ill-treatment that were most deplorable. Internees were frequently abused, beaten, and robbed by the guards, whose sergeants would take men into the ship's head for private beatings. Many of the troops were "Soldiers of the King's Pardon" who had been released from prison to help in the war effort, but others were regular soldiers from the Royal Norfolks, Suffolks and the Queen's Own Regiment.

Using a tune learned from their British warders, internees composed and sang "regularly on board the ship" "My luggage went into the ocean, My luggage went into the sea, My luggage was thrown in the ocean, Oh, bring back my luggage to me!" Most internees were kept below decks throughout the voyage, except for daily 10-minute exercise periods, during which internees would walk around the deck under heavy guard; during one such period, a guard smashed beer bottles on the deck so that the internees would have to walk on the shards. In contrast to the Army personnel, the ship's crew and officers showed kindness to the internees, and some later testified at the soldiers' courts-martial.

While passing through the Irish Sea, the Dunera was struck by a torpedo that failed to detonate; a second torpedo passed underneath the vessel, which was lifted out of its path by the rough seas. After the war it was discovered, partly from a German submarine captain's diary, that, on another occasion, the Dunera was saved from being destroyed because of the German-language items tossed overboard, "and picked up ... to inspect" by that captain's divers who concluded that the ship was carrying prisoners of war.

Arrival and internment

On arrival in Sydney on 6 September 1940, the first Australian on board was medical army officer Alan Frost. He was appalled and his subsequent report led to a court martial at Chelsea Barracks, London, in May 1941. The officer in charge, Major William Patrick Scott was "severely reprimanded" as was Sergeant  Arthur Helliwell; RSM Charles Albert Bowles was reduced to the ranks and given a twelve-month prison sentence and then discharged from the British Army. Lieutenant John O'Neill VC was an officer of the Pioneers.

Back in Britain relatives had not at first been told what had happened to the internees, but as letters arrived from Australia there was a clamour to have them released and heated exchanges in the House of Commons. Colonel Victor Cazalet, a Conservative MP said, on 22 August 1940: 

Churchill reportedly regretted the hasty deportations, especially of those who had been seeking Britain's aid. A fund of £35,000 (equivalent to £ million in ) was set up to compensate the Dunera passengers for the loss of their belongings.

While interned in Australia, the internees set up and administered their own township with Hay currency (which is now a valuable collectors' item) and an unofficial "university." When the Japanese attacked Pearl Harbor in 1941, the prisoners were reclassified as "friendly aliens" and released by the Australian Government. About a thousand volunteered to join the Australian Military Forces and, having shown themselves to be "dinkum", were offered residency at the end of the war. Almost all the rest made their way back to Britain, many of them joining the armed forces there. Others were recruited as interpreters or into the intelligence services.

Notable transportees
Among the transportees on the Dunera were: 

 Joseph Asher, rabbi
 philosophers Kurt Baier and Peter Herbst; 
 Giovanni Baldelli, Italian anarchist theorist
 Felix Behrend, mathematician
 Boaz Bischofswerder, rabbi and composer, and his son Felix Werder, composer
 author Ulrich Boschwitz (pen name John Grane); 
 theoretical physicist Hans Buchdahl and his engineer (later philosopher) brother Gerd; 
 research scientist F. W. Eirich; 
 Engineering Professor Paul Eisenklam; 
 Walter Freud, grandson of Sigmund Freud; 
 Heinz Henghes, sculptor
 Helmut Gernsheim, photographer
 economist Fred Gruen; 
 Walter Kaufmann, writer
 Wolf Klaphake, the inventor of synthetic camphor; 
 art historian Ernst Kitzinger; 
 Johannes Matthaeus Koelz / John Matthew Kelts, artist;
 nuclear physicist Hans Kronberger; 
 the tenor Erich Liffmann; 
 Martin Löb, mathematician
 furniture design partners Fred Lowen (born Fritz Karl Heinz Lowenstein) and Ernst Roedeck. 
 artist Ludwig Hirschfeld Mack; 
 composer Ray Martin (born Kurt Kohn); 
 Henry Mayer (lawyer), Author and Professor of politics at the University of Sydney
 Hans Joseph Meyer, teacher at Bunce Court School in Kent,
 Richard Sonnenfeldt, a German-born Jew who would serve as the chief interpreter for the American prosecution at the post-war Nuremberg trials.
 Franz Stampfl, later the athletics coach to the four-minute-mile runner Roger Bannister; 
 Bert Stern, the father of economist Nicholas Stern, Baron Stern of Brentford who made a pilgrimage to Hay to see the camp; 
 fashion photographer Henry Talbot; 
 Wilhelm Unger, writer 
 Professor Hugo Wolfsohn, political scientist;

Legacy
The 1985 Australian mini series The Dunera Boys depicts the events, as do several books and websites.

The 2001 Oscar-winning documentary, Into the Arms of Strangers: Stories of the Kindertransport, features an interview with Dunera and Kindertransport survivor, Alexander Gordon. 

Nothing remains of Hay internment camp except a road called Dunera Way and a memorial stone which reads:

Later service as a troopship
HMT Duneras next notable services were the Madagascar operations in September 1942, the Sicily landings in July 1943 and in September 1944, she carried the headquarters staff for the US 7th Army for the invasion of southern France. After the Japanese surrender in 1945, Dunera transported occupation forces to Japan.

Post-war career
In 1950/1951, Dunera was refitted by Barclay, Curle to improve her to postwar troopship specifications: her capacity was now 123 First Class, 95 Second Class, 100 Third Class and 831 troops; tonnages now 12,615 gross, 7,563 net and 3,675 tons deadweight.

The Ministry of Defence terminated Duneras trooping charter in 1960 and she was refitted by Palmers Shipbuilding and Iron Company at Hebburn-on-Tyne in early 1961 for her new role as an educational cruise ship. New facilities (classrooms, swimming pool, games rooms, library and assembly rooms) were introduced. Tam Dalyell, who later went on to become Member of Parliament for West Lothian, was Director of Studies on the ship between 1961 and 1962.

The Dunera was subsequently a cruise ship until November 1967, when it was sold to Revalorizacion de Materiales SA, and scrapped at Bilbao.

See also
 Hay Internment and POW camps

Notes and references

Further reading

External links
 Shipping Times
 The Dunera Boys at IMDb.
 HMT Dunera, Troop Ship to School Ship: Wartime Trips and School Educational Tours
 The Dunera Association

1937 ships
Ships of the British India Steam Navigation Company
Troop ships of the Royal Navy
World War II auxiliary ships of the United Kingdom